The James A. Porter Colloquium is a three-day scholarly program at Howard University exploring African American art history and cultural development. Started in 1990 by art historian Dr. Floyd Coleman, the Porter Colloquium is the foremost academic setting for innovative dialogue and perspectives from leading and emerging scholars, artist, collectors, and cultural critics.

Over the years the Colloquium's presenters have included leaders in the field, such as David Driskell, Ann Gibson, Leslie King Hammond, Samella Lewis, Lowery Stokes Sims, Deborah Willis and Judith Wilson.  The Colloquium is named in honor of the pioneering Howard University art historian and painter, James A. Porter.

References

External links
Porter Colloquium, Howard University

African-American art
Howard University
1990 establishments in Washington, D.C.